Mudashiru Babatunde "Muda" Lawal (8 June 1954 – 6 July 1991) was a Nigerian footballer who played as a midfielder for both club and country.

Club career
He worked as an automobile mechanic before his football talents were discovered, and made his national team debut in 1975. The same year, he joined Shooting Stars F.C. of Ibadan, where he would play for many years. In 1976, he helped the club to their first continental title, winning the African Cup Winners Cup – the first Nigerian team to do so. In 1985 the club side was disbanded by a military governor. Muda returned to the side four seasons latter as an assistant coach/player.

International career
Muda made his international debut in 1975, and won 86 caps and scored 12 goals for his country; he holds the record of being the only player on the continent to have appeared at five consecutive Nations' Cup finals (1976–1984). Lawal guided Nigeria to its first African Nations Cup title, at the 1980 African Nations Cup. The team also competed at the Summer Olympics the same year.

Lawal played his last international match on 18 August 1985, when Nigeria lost to Zambia in the 1986 African Cup of Nations qualifier.

Death
Lawal died in his home in 1991. The Ashero Stadium in his hometown Abeokuta was named after him upon his death.

References

External links
 
 

1954 births
1991 deaths
Africa Cup of Nations-winning players
Nigerian footballers
Nigerian expatriate footballers
Olympic footballers of Nigeria
Footballers at the 1980 Summer Olympics
Nigeria international footballers
1976 African Cup of Nations players
1978 African Cup of Nations players
1980 African Cup of Nations players
1982 African Cup of Nations players
1984 African Cup of Nations players
Shooting Stars S.C. players
Sportspeople from Abeokuta
Yoruba sportspeople
Association football midfielders
Abiola Babes F.C. players
African Games silver medalists for Nigeria
African Games medalists in football
Competitors at the 1978 All-Africa Games
20th-century Nigerian people